The Philosophical Library (Philosophical and Religious Free Library) is a non-profit organization run entirely by volunteers and founded in 1963. It administers extensive lending privileges in a wide array of books in the fields of philosophy, religion, metaphysics and spiritual practices. It presents itself as a "place of fellowship and spiritual growth as well as a research and study center."
The Philosophical Library's mission statement: "Our mission at The Philosophical Library is to create a Conscious Community by providing unique resources for those seeking meaning through diverse paths of Wisdom."

Notes

References
 Pat Sherman (2005). Philosophical library hosts unity discussion group in Escondido,  San Diego UNION-TRIBUNE, September 9, 2005.  Source: 
 Lorell Fleming (2007). Philosophical Library reopens for public,  North County Times, Sunday, March 25, 2007.  Source: 
 Angela Holman (2007). Sewing bees fight plastic bags, raise funds for library,  San Diego UNION-TRIBUNE, August 22, 2007.  Source: 
 Darcy Leigh Richardson (2007). Philosophical Library feels renewed in its new home,  San Diego UNION-TRIBUNE, March 24, 2007.  Source: 
 Vision Magazine (2007). Philosophical Library and Bookstore,  Vision Magazine, April 2007.  Source:

External links
 

Philosophical societies in the United States
Organizations based in San Diego